Peter La Farge (April 30, 1931 – October 27, 1965) was an American singer and songwriter.

Early life and education
Oliver Albee La Farge was born in 1931 to Oliver La Farge, a Pulitzer Prize-winning novelist and anthropologist, and Wanden (Matthews) La Farge, a Rhode Island heiress. The family moved to Santa Fe, New Mexico, where his younger sister Povy was born in 1933. His parents divorced in 1937. 

La Farge grew up partly in New Mexico and partly on the Kane Ranch in Colorado, although he did not get along well with his stepfather. He shared a love and respect with his father for the histories and cultures of Native Americans, with which his father was deeply involved in study. But he later became estranged from his father, changed his given name to Peter, and at times would even claim, falsely, that he was adopted.

Peter went to Fountain-Fort Carson High School but left before graduating. Around this time, he appeared in local theatrical amateur nights, and in 1946/47 he sang cowboy songs on Colorado Springs radio stations KVOR and KRDO. Throughout his childhood, Peter went to rodeos with his stepfather Andy Kane (who took part in roping events). As a teenager, Peter began to compete as a rodeo rider in both bareback and saddle bronc events.

Korean War and early career
La Farge joined the United States Navy in 1950 and served in the aircraft carrier USS Boxer throughout the Korean War. He also joined the Central Intelligence Division (CID) as an undercover agent involved in efforts to suppress narcotics smuggling. While in the Navy, he learned to box and took part in a few dozen prize fights, in the course of which his nose was broken twice. His ship was once hit by a plane that missed its landing, and he suffered burns in the ensuing fire. He was discharged in 1953 and awarded the China Service Medal, a U.N. Service Medal and Ribbon, and a Korean Service Medal and Ribbon (5 stars).

After the war, La Farge competed again as a rodeo cowboy, getting injured often and almost losing a leg in one accident with a Brahma bull. Following his recuperation, he studied acting at the Goodman Theater drama school in Chicago and took supporting roles in local plays, remaining in the city for two years. During this period, he married a fellow actor, Suzanne Becker.

New York years and later career
La Farge relocated to New York City, where he became interested in music. As a young musician, he worked with Big Bill Broonzy, Josh White, and Cisco Houston; Houston became La Farge's mentor, in songwriting and in life. As a singer-songwriter, Peter La Farge became well known as a folk music singer in Greenwich Village. He was contracted briefly with Columbia Records.

At a September 1962 Carnegie Hall "hootenanny" hosted by Seeger as a means of introducing new talent, Dylan performed a song that he never recorded, La Farge's "As Long as the Grass Shall Grow".

His performances in Greenwich Village gained him a recording contract with Moses Asch, founder of Folkways Records. La Farge's five Folkways albums (1962–1965) were dedicated to Native American themes, as well as blues, cowboy songs, and love songs. "The Ballad of Ira Hayes," his most famous song, is the story of Ira Hayes, a Pima Indian who became a hero as one of six United States Marines who raised the U.S. flag on Iwo Jima. He later suffered from prejudice and struggled with the return to civilian life, becoming an alcoholic. This song was covered by Johnny Cash on his 1964 album Bitter Tears: Ballads of the American Indian, reaching Number 2 on the Billboard country music chart. Cash credited La Farge with inspiring the entire album, which included four other La Farge songs besides "The Ballad of Ira Hayes."

By 1965, La Farge was also becoming known as an artist and painter. He lived with the Danish singer Inger Nielsen, and the pair had a daughter, Karen. They did not marry in part because La Farge was still married to Suzanne, who was then in a mental institution in Michigan.

La Farge was signed to MGM Records, where he planned a new album. However, in October 1965, Peter La Farge was found dead in his New York City apartment by Inger Nielsen. He was said to have died from a stroke or (more probably) an overdose of Thorazine, an addictive sleep aid that Johnny Cash allegedly had introduced to him. He was buried in Fountain, Colorado.

In 2010, a tribute album, Rare Breed, was recorded.

Selected discography
 1962: Ira Hayes and Other Ballads
 1962: Iron Mountain and Other Songs
 1963: As Long as the Grass Shall Grow: Peter La Farge Sings of the Indians
 1963: Peter La Farge Sings of the Cowboys: Cowboy, Ranch and Rodeo Songs, and Cattle Calls
 1964: Peter La Farge Sings Women Blues: Peter La Farge Sings Love Songs
 1965: Peter LaFarge on the Warpath
 2010: Rare Breed: The Songs of Peter La Farge

References

Sources
 Cash, Johnny. Cash: The Autobiography of Johnny Cash. Harper, 2000. 
 Schulman, Sandra Hale. The Ballad of Peter LaFarge, a 2010 documentary. UPC 8-85444-39205-4
 Sounes, Howard. Down the Highway: The Life of Bob Dylan. Doubleday, 2001.

External links
 Peter La Farge biography
 Illustrated Peter La Farge discography
  at Smithsonian Folkways
 Folk Music Worldwide  includes 2 recorded interviews with Peter LaFarge from September and October 1963 on Alan Wasser's New York City radio show.

1931 births
1965 deaths
American male singer-songwriters
American folk singers
United States Navy sailors
American people who self-identify as being of Native American descent
20th-century American singers
Bareback bronc riders
Saddle bronc riders
People from Fountain, Colorado
Sportspeople from Colorado
20th-century American male singers
Folkways Records artists
La Farge family
Singer-songwriters from Colorado
Drug-related deaths in New York City